El Carmen is a Colombian municipality located in the department of North Santander.

References

Municipalities of the Norte de Santander Department